The 1969 Soviet football championship was the 37th seasons of competitive football in the Soviet Union and the 31st among teams of sports societies and factories. Spartak won the championship becoming the Soviet domestic champions for the ninth time.

Honours

Notes = Number in parentheses is the times that club has won that honour. * indicates new record for competition

Soviet Union football championship

Class A First Group (second stage)

Places 1–14

Places 15–20

Class A Second Group finals

For places 1-4
 [Oct 31 - Nov 6, Simferopol]

Class B

Russian Federation finals
 [Oct 28 – Nov 10, Maykop]

Play-off for 1st place 
 Druzhba Maykop  1-0  Saturn Rybinsk

Ukraine finals

 [Oct 25 – Nov 2, Ivano-Frankovsk]

Caucasus

Kazakhstan

Central Asia

Top goalscorers

Class A First Group
Vladimir Proskurin (SKA Rostov-na-Donu), Nikolay Osianin (Spartak Moscow), Dzhemal Kherhadze (Torpedo Kutaisi) – 16 goals

References

External links
 1969 Soviet football championship. RSSSF